Folila is the sixth studio album by Mali musicians Amadou & Mariam. The title means "music" in Bambara.

Recording
Folila was originally going to be two separate albums. One album was recorded in New York City and featured contributions from TV on the Radio, Santigold, Nick Zinner, Jake Shears, Theophilus London, members of Antibalas and Bertrand Cantat. A second album, featuring the same set of songs, was recorded in Amadou and Mariam's hometown of Bamako and featured a team of African artists. However, the couple decided to combine the two albums together to create Folila.

Reception

Folila has received generally positive reviews. On the review aggregate site Metacritic, the album has a score of 71 out of 100, indicating "Generally favorable review."

Thom Jurek of Allmusic gave the album a positive review, writing "Forget prejudices about 'world music'; Folila is great music. Period." Entertainment Weekly's Kyle Anderson also praised the album, writing "Though they sing in different languages, the tongue of teamwork makes for universal understanding [..]" Pitchfork Media's Joe Tangari wrote: "Even if Folila is less surprising than the two albums that came before it, it still makes me look forward to seeing where they'll take this fusion next." Paste's Doug Heselgrave wrote of the guest musicians: "Musical purists may grumble that the only reason listeners first come to this album is because of the many guests that appear on it. But, really, who cares? Amadou & Mariam’s music is strong enough to stand on its own, and it’s a fair bet that people who start with Folila won’t stop listening until they’ve heard all of their albums."

BBC Music's David Katz, on the other hand, was mixed on how the album was assembled, writing "If your tastes are eclectic enough, and if you can get past the factor of contriving, you are bound to love this entire album. But more selective souls may find themselves reaching for the fast-forward button, as perhaps the original plan would have yielded a more cohesive whole." The Observer's Neil Spencer criticized Jake Shears' and Amp Fiddler's contributions, calling them "marginal." Summing up the album, Spencer wrote: "Folila, packed with western friends, mixes the inspired and mundane."

The album was listed at #49 on Rolling Stone's list of the top 50 albums of 2012. Folila was also nominated for a Grammy Award for Best Contemporary World Music Album in 2012.

Track listing

Personnel
The following people contributed to Folila:

Mariam & Amadou
	Amadou Bagayoko 	-	Composer, Guitar, Guitar (Electric), Vocals
	Mariam Doumbia 	-	Composer, Vocals

Additional musicians
Yvo Abadi - bass, drums, percussion
Tunde Adebimpe - composer, vocals
Victor Axelrod - keyboards, Wurlitzer
Stuart Bogie - tenor sax
Bertrand Cantat -composer, doum-doum, guitar, harmonica, vocals
Tony Cousins 	-	Mastering
Baubacar Dembélé 	-	Djembe
Boubacar Dembele 	-	Balafon, Conga, Djembe, Doum-doum
Vieux Dembélé 	-	Djembe
Yao Dembele 	-	Bass, Percussion
Sidiki Diabate 	-	Kora
Tomani Diabate 	-	Kora
Ebony Bones 	-	Composer, Vocals
Amp Fiddler 	-	Keyboards
Ahmed Fofana 	-	Bass, Flute, Keyboards
Sanogo Foussn 	-	Doum-doum
Laurent Griffon 	-	Bass
Antoine Halet 	-	Collaboration, Engineer, Guitar, Guitar (Acoustic), Mixing
Bassekou Kouyate 	-	Ngoni
Christophe Millot 	-	Clarinet (Bass)
Theophilus London 	-	Composer, Vocals
Kyp Malone 	-	Composer, Vocals
Manjul 	-	Percussion
Jordan McLean 	-	Trumpet
Santigold 	-	Composer, Vocals
Jake Shears 	-	Composer, Vocals
Idrissa Soumaro 	-	Organ, Piano
Jared Tankel 	-	Sax (Baritone)
Tanti Kouaté & Her Choir 	-	Choir, Chorus
Nick Zinner - electric and acoustic guitar
Abdallah Oumbadougou - composer, vocals

Additional personnel
	Julien Bescond 	-	A&R
	Josh Grant 	-	Engineer, Mixing
	Kennie Takahashi 	-	Mixing
	Renaud Letang 	-	Mixing
	Marc Antoine Moreau 	-	A&R, Arranger, Composer, Producer
	François Morel 	-	Design
	Thomas Moulin 	-	Assistant
	Benoît Peverelli 	-	Photography

Charts

References

External links
Nonesuch Records' page on Folila

2012 albums
Amadou & Mariam albums
Nonesuch Records albums